The men's freestyle featherweight competition at the 1932 Summer Olympics in Los Angeles took place from 1 August to 3 August at the Grand Olympic Auditorium. Nations were limited to one competitor. This weight class was limited to wrestlers weighing up to 61kg.

This freestyle wrestling competition did not use the single-elimination bracket format previously used for Olympic freestyle wrestling but instead followed the format that was introduced at the 1928 Summer Olympics for Greco-Roman wrestling, using an elimination system based on the accumulation of points. Each round featured all wrestlers pairing off and wrestling one bout (with one wrestler having a bye if there were an odd number). The loser received 3 points. The winner received 1 point if the win was by decision and 0 points if the win was by fall. At the end of each round, any wrestler with at least 5 points was eliminated.

Schedule

Results

Round 1

Of the five bouts, two were won by fall to give Chasson and Pihlajamäki 0 points while the other three winners each received 1 point for wins by decision. The five losers each received 3 points.

 Bouts

 Points

Round 2

Pihlajamäki quickly became the only remaining 0-point wrestler, with a second win by fall. Farmakidis and Nemir also won by fall this round, staying at 1 point each. Karlsson's second win, like his first, was by decision; he had 2 points after the round. Chasson was the only first-round winner to lose in the second (his facing Farmakidis made it impossible that all five could win), dropping to 3 points. This total was matched by Taylor, the winner of the match-up between two first-round losers. The other four wrestlers who lost in the first round lost again in round 2, being eliminated.

 Bouts

 Points

Round 3

One bout this round was sure to result in elimination, pitting two 3-point wrestlers against each other. Chasson forfeited the bout, leaving Taylor at 3 points. Karlsson survived potential elimination by defeating Farmakidis; the former had 3 points after his third straight win by decision while the latter jumped to 4 points. Nemir also moved to 4 points after losing to Pihlajamäki

 Bouts

 Points

Round 4

Pihlajamäki won his fourth bout, picking up a second point with the win by decision and eliminating Farmakidis. Nemir, who started with 4 points and therefore needed a win by fall to continue, won by fall, eliminating Taylor. Karlsson had a bye, staying at 3 points.

 Bouts

 Points

Final round

Pihlajamäki finished with a win over Karlsson, ending 5–0 with a gold medal due to his previous win over Nemir. Karlsson's loss moved him to 6 points and the bronze medal.

 Bouts

 Points

References

Wrestling at the 1932 Summer Olympics